Yoka or Yōka may refer to the following people:
Given name
Yoka Berretty (1928–2015), Dutch actress
Yōka Wao (born 1968), Japanese performing artist
N'Yoka Longo, a Congolese singer

Surname
Aimé Emmanuel Yoka, Congolese politician 
Tony Yoka (born 1992), French boxer